is a passenger railway station  located in the city of Sakaiminato, Tottori Prefecture, Japan. It is operated by the West Japan Railway Company (JR West).

Lines

Station layout
The station consists of one ground-level bay platform serving two tracks. The station building has a design reminiscent of a lighthouse at the head end. The station has a Midori no Madoguchi staffed ticket office.

Adjacent stations

History
It was renamed July 1, 1918.

Passenger statistics
In fiscal 2018, the station was used by an average of 874 passengers daily.

Surrounding area
Port of Sakaiminato

See also
List of railway stations in Japan

References

External links 

 Sakaiminato Station from JR-Odekake.net 

Railway stations in Japan opened in 1902
Railway stations in Tottori Prefecture
Stations of West Japan Railway Company
Sakaiminato, Tottori